Omolara Omotosho (born 25 May 1993 in Akure, Nigeria) is a Nigerian sprinter who specializes in the 400 metres. She represented Nigeria at the 2012 Summer Olympics.

Her personal best in the event is 51.28 seconds (Calabar 2012).

Competition record

1 Disqualified in the final.2 Disqualified in the semifinals.

References 

1993 births
Living people
Yoruba sportswomen
Nigerian female sprinters
Athletes (track and field) at the 2012 Summer Olympics
Athletes (track and field) at the 2016 Summer Olympics
Olympic athletes of Nigeria
Athletes (track and field) at the 2014 Commonwealth Games
People from Akure
Commonwealth Games medallists in athletics
Commonwealth Games silver medallists for Nigeria
Competitors at the 2015 Summer Universiade
Athletes (track and field) at the 2011 All-Africa Games
African Games competitors for Nigeria
Olympic female sprinters
21st-century Nigerian women
Medallists at the 2014 Commonwealth Games